Ilias "Maik" Galakos is a Greek former professional footballer who played as a striker and was active during the 1970s and 1980s.

Galakos was born on 23 November 1951 in Kalogreza, Greece and his family emigrated to Germany where he first played football for Fortuna Düsseldorf (1972–1973). He returned to Greece and played for Olympiacos from 1973 to 1981 before signing with Panathinaikos. Galakos played for the greens between 1981 and 1985. He retired after playing in 255 Alpha Ethniki matches.

Galakos was capped 30 times by the Greece national team, scoring five goals.

Career statistics

Honours
Olympiacos
 Alpha Ethniki: 1973–74, 1974–75, 1979–80, 1980–81
 Greek Cup: 1974–75, 1980–81

Panathinaikos
 Alpha Ethniki: 1983–84
 Greek Cup: 1981–82, 1983–84

References

External links

Maik Galakos Biography 
Fortuna Düsseldorf Roster 1972/73 
FC St. Pauli Roster 1977/78 

1951 births
Living people
Footballers from Athens
Greek footballers
Greek emigrants to Germany
Association football forwards
Greece international footballers
UEFA Euro 1980 players
Super League Greece players
Bundesliga players
Fortuna Düsseldorf players
Olympiacos F.C. players
FC St. Pauli players
Panathinaikos F.C. players
Greek football managers
Panathinaikos F.C. managers
Greek expatriate footballers
Greek expatriate sportspeople in Germany
Expatriate footballers in Germany